.bv is the Internet country code top-level domain (ccTLD) reserved for the uninhabited Norwegian dependent territory of Bouvet Island. The domain name registry and sponsor is Norid, but  is not open for registration.  was designated on 21 August 1997 and was placed under the  registry Norid. Norwegian policy states that  is sufficient for those institutions connected to Bouvet Island, and therefore the domain is not open to registration. It is Norwegian policy not to commercialize domain resources, so there are no plans to sell .

History
Bouvet Island is an uninhabited volcanic island in the South Atlantic Ocean. It was claimed by Norway in 1927. The domain was allocated on 21 August 1997, at the same time  was allocated for Svalbard and Jan Mayen. The allocation occurred because the Internet Assigned Numbers Authority (IANA) assigns ccTLDs to all entities with an ISO 3166 code, for which Bouvet Island is designated .

The proposal aims at protecting both the Norwegian authorities and foreign dissidents from surveillance.

In March 2012, Norid began an initial collaboration with the Dutch domain registry SIDN, with the purpose of examining the possibility of utilizing the  domain on the Dutch market. BV is the most common form of limited company in the Netherlands, which could have made  a popular domain. The collaboration ended in June 2016, when The Ministry of Transport and Communications advised that dispensation from certain parts of the Norwegian Domain Regulations, which would have opened for the sale of the  domain, should not be granted.

Policy
Norid is a limited company owned by Uninett, which is owned by the Norwegian Ministry of Education and Research. The legal right to manage the domains is twofold, based both on an agreement with the IANA and regulations via the Telecommunication Act which is supervised by the Lillesand-based Norwegian Post and Telecommunications Authority.

The domain remains reserved for potential future use.

References

Bibliography

Bouvet Island
Country code top-level domains
Council of European National Top Level Domain Registries members
1997 establishments in Norway